

Peerage of England

|Earl of Surrey (1088)||William de Warenne, 5th Earl of Surrey||1199||1240|| 
|-
|rowspan=2|Earl of Warwick (1088)||Waleran de Beaumont, 4th Earl of Warwick||1184||1203°||Died
|-
|Henry de Beaumont, 5th Earl of Warwick||1203||1229||
|-
|Earl of Devon (1141)||William de Redvers, 5th Earl of Devon||1193||1217|| 
|-
|rowspan=2|Earl of Leicester (1107)||Robert de Beaumont, 4th Earl of Leicester||1190||1204||Died
|-
|Simon de Montfort, 5th Earl of Leicester||1204°||1218|| 
|-
|Earl of Chester (1121)||Randolph de Blondeville, 4th Earl of Chester||1181||1232|| 
|-
|Earl of Hertford (1135)||Richard de Clare, 4th Earl of Hertford||1173||1217|| 
|-
|rowspan=3|Earl of Richmond (1136)||Constance of Brittany||1171||1201||Died
|-
|Arthur of Brittany||1201||1203||Died
|-
|Eleanor, 5th Countess of Richmond°||1203||1236|| 
|-
|Earl of Arundel (1138)||William d'Aubigny, 3rd Earl of Arundel||1193||1221|| 
|-
|Earl of Derby (1138)||William de Ferrers, 4th Earl of Derby||1190||1247|| 
|-
|Earl of Norfolk (1140)||Roger Bigod, 2nd Earl of Norfolk||1177||1221|| 
|-
|Earl of Oxford (1142)||Aubrey de Vere, 2nd Earl of Oxford||1194||1214|| 
|-
|Earl of Salisbury (1145)||William Longespée, 3rd Earl of Salisbury||1196||1226|| 
|-
|Earl of Pembroke (1189)||William Marshal, 1st Earl of Pembroke||1189||1219|| 
|-
|Earl of Essex (1199)||Geoffrey Fitzpeter, 1st Earl of Essex||1199||1213|| 
|-
|Earl of Hereford (1199)||Henry de Bohun, 1st Earl of Hereford||1199||1220|| 
|-
|Earl of Winchester (1207)||Saer de Quincy, 1st Earl of Winchester||1207||1219||New creation

Peerage of Scotland

|Earl of Mar (1114)||Gille Críst, Earl of Mar||Abt. 1178||Abt. 1220||
|-
|Earl of Dunbar (1115)||Patrick I, Earl of Dunbar||1182||1232||
|-
|Earl of Angus (1115)||Gille Críst, Earl of Angus||1197||Abr. 1210||
|-
|Earl of Atholl (1115)||Henry, Earl of Atholl||Abt 1190||1210||
|-
|Earl of Buchan (1115)||Margaret, Countess of Buchan||Abt. 1195||Abt. 1243||
|-
|Earl of Strathearn (1115)||Gille Brigte, Earl of Strathearn||1171||1223||
|-
|rowspan=2|Earl of Fife (1129)||Donnchad II, Earl of Fife||1154||1203||Died
|-
|Máel Coluim I, Earl of Fife||1203||1228||
|-
|Earl of Menteith (1160)||Muireadhach I, Earl of Menteith||Abt. 1190||Abt. 1213||
|-
|Earl of Lennox (1184)||Ailín I, Earl of Lennox||1184||1220||
|-
|Earl of Carrick (1184)||Donnchadh, Earl of Carrick||1186||1250||
|-
|}

Peerage of Ireland

|Earl of Ulster (1205)||Hugh de Lacy, 1st Earl of Ulster||1205||1242||New creation
|-
|Baron Athenry (1172)||Robert de Bermingham||1172||1218||
|-
|}

Notes

The Earl of Warwick's death date cannot be defined with precision. See Earl of Warwick.
The transfer of the Earldom of Leicester was confirmed in 1207, although the fourth earl died in 1204. See Earl of Leicester.
Only some affirmed the claim that Eleanor succeeded her brother, Arthur, to the title; see Earl of Richmond.

References

 

Lists of peers by decade
1200s in England
1200s in Ireland
13th century in Scotland
13th-century English people
13th-century Irish people
13th-century mormaers
Peers